Eric Hilliard Nelson (May 8, 1940 – December 31, 1985) was an American musician and actor. From age eight he starred alongside his family in the radio and television series The Adventures of Ozzie and Harriet. In 1957, he began a long and successful career as a popular recording artist. The expression "teen idol" was first coined to describe Nelson, and his fame as both a recording artist and television star also led to a motion picture role co-starring alongside John Wayne, Dean Martin, Walter Brennan, and Angie Dickinson in Howard Hawks's western feature film Rio Bravo (1959). He placed 54 songs on the Billboard Hot 100, and its predecessors, between 1957 and 1973, including "Poor Little Fool" in 1958, which was the first number one song on Billboard magazine's then-newly created Hot 100 chart. He recorded 19 additional top ten hits and was inducted into the Rock and Roll Hall of Fame on January 21, 1987.  In 1996 Nelson was ranked No. 49 on TV Guide's 50 Greatest TV Stars of All Time.

Nelson began his entertainment career in 1949, playing himself in the radio sitcom series, The Adventures of Ozzie and Harriet. In 1952, he appeared in his first feature film, Here Come the Nelsons. In 1957, he recorded his first single ("I'm Walkin' b/w "A Teenager's Romance", Verve 10047X4S), debuted as a singer on the television version of the sitcom, and released the No. 1 album titled Ricky. In 1958, Nelson released his first #1 single, "Poor Little Fool", and in 1959 received a Golden Globe nomination for "Most Promising Male Newcomer" after starring in Rio Bravo. A few films followed, and when the television series was cancelled in 1966, Nelson made occasional appearances as a guest star on various television programs.  In his twenties, he moved away from the pop music of his youth, and began to perform in a country rock style. After recording several albums with mostly session musicians, most of which flopped, he formed the Stone Canyon Band in 1969 and experienced a career resurgence, buoyed by the live album In Concert at the Troubadour, 1969 and had a surprise hit with 1972's "Garden Party", which peaked at number six on the Billboard Hot 100.  His comeback was short-lived, however, as his record label was bought out and folded, and his followup albums were not well promoted by his new label.  He continued to perform live and take small television roles through the 1970s, though his label dropped him by the end of the decade.  He released two more albums, with unimpressive results, before his death in a plane crash on New Year's Eve, 1985.

Nelson was married once, to Sharon Kristin Harmon, from 1963 until their divorce in 1982. They had four children: actress Tracy Nelson, twin sons and musicians Gunnar and Matthew, and actor Sam.

Early life
Nelson was born on May 8, 1940, in Teaneck, New Jersey. He was the second son of entertainment couple Harriet Hilliard Nelson (born Peggy Lou Snyder; July 18, 1909 – October 2, 1994) and Ozzie Nelson (March 20, 1906 – June 3, 1975). His father Ozzie was of half Swedish descent. The Nelsons' older son was actor David Nelson (October 24, 1936 – January 11, 2011).

Harriet, normally the vocalist for Ozzie's band, remained in Englewood, New Jersey, with her newborn and toddler. Meanwhile, bandleader Ozzie toured with the Nelson orchestra. The Nelsons bought a two-story colonial house in Tenafly, New Jersey, and six months after the purchase, moved with son David to Hollywood, where Ozzie and Harriet were slated to appear in the 1941–42 season of Red Skelton's The Raleigh Cigarette Hour; Ricky remained in Tenafly in the care of his paternal grandmother. In November 1941, the Nelsons bought what would become their permanent home: a green and white, two-story, Cape Cod colonial home at 1822 Camino Palmero in Los Angeles. Ricky joined his parents and brother in Los Angeles in 1942.

Ricky was a small and insecure child who suffered from severe asthma. At night, his sleep was eased with a vaporizer emitting tincture of evergreen. He was described by Red Skelton's producer John Guedel as "an odd little kid", likable, shy, introspective, mysterious, and inscrutable. When Skelton was drafted in 1944, Guedel crafted the radio sitcom The Adventures of Ozzie and Harriet for Ricky's parents. The show debuted on Sunday, October 8, 1944, to favorable reviews. Ozzie eventually became head writer for the show and based episodes on the fraternal exploits and enmity of his sons. The Nelson boys were first played in the radio series by professional child actors until twelve-year-old Dave and eight-year-old Ricky joined the show on February 20, 1949, in the episode "Invitation to Dinner".

In 1952, the Nelsons tested the waters for a television series with the theatrically released film Here Come the Nelsons. The film was a hit, and Ozzie was convinced the family could make the transition from radio's airwaves to television's small screen. On October 3, 1952, The Adventures of Ozzie and Harriet made its television debut and was broadcast in first run until September 3, 1966, to become one of the longest running sitcoms in television history.

Education
Nelson attended Gardner Street Public School, Bancroft Junior High, and, between 1954 and 1958, Hollywood High School, from which he graduated with a B average. He played football at Hollywood High and represented the school in interscholastic tennis matches. Twenty-five years later, Nelson told the Los Angeles Weekly he hated school because it "smelled of pencils" and he was forced to rise early in the morning to attend.

Ozzie Nelson was a Rutgers alumnus and keen on college education, but eighteen-year-old Ricky was already in the 93 percent income-tax bracket and saw no reason to attend. At age thirteen, Ricky was making over $100,000 per annum, and at sixteen he had a personal fortune of $500,000.

Nelson's wealth was astutely managed by his parents, who channeled his earnings into trust funds. Although his parents permitted him a $50 allowance at the age of eighteen, Ricky was often strapped for cash and one evening collected and redeemed empty pop bottles to gain entrance to a movie theater for himself and a date.

Music career

Debut

Nelson played clarinet and drums in his tweens and early teens, learned the rudimentary guitar chords, and vocally imitated his favorite Sun Records rockabilly artists in the bathroom at home or in the showers at the Los Angeles Tennis Club. He was strongly influenced by the music of Carl Perkins and once said he tried to emulate the sound and the tone of the guitar break in Perkins's March 1956 Top Ten hit "Blue Suede Shoes".

At age sixteen, he wanted to impress his girlfriend of two years, Diana Osborn(e), who was an Elvis fan and, although he had no record contract at the time, told her that he, too, was going to make a record. With his father's help, he secured a one-record deal with Verve Records, an important jazz label looking for a young and popular personality who could sing or be taught to sing. On March 26, 1957, he recorded the Fats Domino standard "I'm Walkin'" and "A Teenager's Romance" (released in late April 1957 as his first single), and "You're My One and Only Love".

Before the single was released, he made his television rock-and-roll debut on April 10, 1957, singing and playing the drums to "I'm Walkin'" in the Ozzie and Harriet episode "Ricky, the Drummer". About the same time, he made an unpaid public appearance, singing "Blue Moon of Kentucky" with the Four Preps at a Hamilton High School lunch-hour assembly in Los Angeles and was greeted by hordes of screaming teens who had seen the television episode.

"I'm Walkin'" reached No. 4 on Billboard'''s Best Sellers in Stores chart, and its flip side, "A Teenager's Romance", hit #2. When the television series went on summer break in 1957, Nelson made his first road trip and played four state and county fairs in Ohio and Wisconsin with the Four Preps, who opened and closed for him.

First album, band, and #1 single
In early summer 1957, Ozzie Nelson pulled his son from Verve after disputes about royalties and signed him to a lucrative five-year deal with Imperial Records that gave him approval over song selection, sleeve artwork, and other production details. Ricky's first Imperial single, "Be-Bop Baby", generated 750,000 advance orders, sold over one million copies, and reached No. 3 on the charts. Nelson's first album, Ricky, was released in October 1957 and hit #1 before the end of the year. Following these successes, Nelson was given a more prominent role on the Ozzie and Harriet show and ended every two or three episodes with a musical number.

Nelson grew increasingly dissatisfied performing with older jazz and country session musicians, who were openly contemptuous of rock and roll. After his Ohio and Minnesota tours in the summer of 1957, he decided to form his own band with members closer to his age. Eighteen-year-old electric guitarist James Burton was the first signed. Bassist James Kirkland, drummer Richie Frost, and pianist Gene Garf completed the band. Their first recording together was "Believe What You Say". Prior to this, Joe Maphis had been playing the lead guitar part, and played lead on his first hits "Be-Bop Baby", "Stood Up", and "Waitin In School".

In 1958, Nelson recorded 17-year-old Sharon Sheeley's "Poor Little Fool" for his second album, Ricky Nelson, released in June 1958. Radio airplay brought the tune notice, and Imperial suggested releasing a single, but Nelson opposed the idea, believing a single would diminish EP sales. When a single was released nonetheless, he exercised his contractual right to approve any artwork and vetoed a picture sleeve. On August 4, 1958, "Poor Little Fool" became the #1 single on Billboard's newly instituted Hot 100 singles chart and sold over two million copies.

Nelson stated:

During 1958 and 1959, Nelson had twelve hits in the charts in comparison with Elvis Presley's eleven. During these two years, Presley had recorded music only for the movie King Creole, in January and February 1958, before his induction into the U.S. Armed Forces and a brief recording session (consisting of five songs) while on military leave four months later. In the summer of 1958, Nelson conducted his first full-scale tour, averaging $5,000 nightly. By 1960, the Ricky Nelson International Fan Club had 9,000 chapters around the world.

Nelson was the first teen idol to use television to promote hit records. Ozzie Nelson even had the idea to edit footage together to create some of the first music videos. This creative editing can be seen in videos Ozzie produced for "Travelin' Man". Nelson appeared on The Ed Sullivan Show in 1967, but his career by that time was in limbo. He also appeared on other television shows (usually in acting roles). In 1973, he had an acting role in an episode of The Streets of San Francisco. He starred in the episode "A Hand For Sonny Blue" from the 1977 series Quinn Martin's Tales of the Unexpected (known in the United Kingdom as Twist in the Tale). In 1979, he guest-hosted on Saturday Night Live, spoofing his television sitcom image by appearing in a Twilight Zone sendup in which, always trying to go "home," he finds himself among the characters from other 1950s/early 1960s-era sitcoms, Leave It to Beaver, Father Knows Best, Make Room for Daddy, and I Love Lucy.

Nelson knew and loved music and was a skilled performer even before he became a teen idol, largely because of his parents' musical background. Nelson worked with many musicians of repute, including James Burton, Joe Osborn, and Allen "Puddler" Harris, all natives of Louisiana, and Joe Maphis, The Jordanaires, Scotty Moore, and Johnny and Dorsey Burnette.

Nelson's music was very well recorded with a clear, punchy sound—thanks in part to engineer Bunny Robyn and producer Jimmy Haskell.

From 1957 to 1962, Nelson had 30 Top-40 hits, more than any other artist except Presley (who had 53) and Pat Boone (38). Many of Nelson's early records were double hits with both the A and B sides hitting the Billboard charts.

While Nelson preferred rockabilly and uptempo rock songs like "Believe What You Say" (Hot 100 #4), "I Got a Feeling" (#10), "My Bucket's Got a Hole in It" (#12), "Hello Mary Lou" (#9), "It's Late" (#9), "Stood Up" (#2), "Waitin' in School" (#18), "Be-Bop Baby" (#3), and "Just a Little Too Much" (#9), his smooth, calm voice made him a natural to sing ballads. He had major success with "Travelin' Man" (#1), "A Teenager's Romance" (#2), "Poor Little Fool" (#1), "Young World" (#5), "Lonesome Town" (#7), "Never Be Anyone Else But You" (#6), "Sweeter Than You" (#9), "It's Up to You" (#6), and "Teen Age Idol" (#5), which clearly could have been about Nelson himself.

Film actor

In addition to his recording career, Nelson appeared in movies. He made his film debut in Here Come the Nelsons (1952) and had a small role in The Story of Three Loves (1953) at MGM directed by Vincente Minnelli playing Farley Granger as a boy.

Following his success on TV and with singing, Howard Hawks cast him as a gunslinger in Rio Bravo (1959) with John Wayne and Dean Martin; Hawks attributed much of the film's box office success to Nelson.

Nelson co-starred with Jack Lemmon in The Wackiest Ship in the Army (1960), which was popular enough to give rise to a TV series (in which Nelson did not appear). He guest starred on General Electric Theatre ("The Wish Book") and starred in a romantic comedy feature written and directed by his father, Love and Kisses (1965) with Jack Kelly.

Nelson guest starred on Hondo (playing Jesse James), and had a support role in The Over-the-Hill Gang (1969) with Walter Brennan and Pat O'Brien.

Nelson was in Fol-de-Rol (1972), guest starred on McCloud, The Streets of San Francisco, Owen Marshall, Counselor at Law, Petrocelli, A Twist in the Tale, The Hardy Boys/Nancy Drew Mysteries, and The Love Boat. On The Hardy Boys/Nancy Drew Mysteries he played the part of "Tony Eagle" and performed various well-known Nelson songs throughout the episode.

He had support roles in the TV films Three on a Date and High School USA (1983).

Name change and 1960s career

On May 8, 1961 (his 21st birthday), he officially modified his recording name from "Ricky Nelson" to "Rick Nelson". His childhood nickname proved hard to shake, especially among the generation who had watched him grow up on "Ozzie and Harriet". Even in the 1980s, when Nelson realized his dream of meeting Carl Perkins, Perkins noted that he and "Ricky" were the last of the "rockabilly breed".

In 1963, Nelson signed a 20-year contract with Decca Records. After some early successes with the label, most notably 1964's "For You" (#6), Nelson's chart career came to a dramatic halt in the wake of Beatlemania, The British Invasion, and later the Counterculture era. However, instead of dropping him, Decca kept him on board.

In the mid-1960s, Nelson began to move towards country music, becoming a pioneer in the country-rock genre. He was one of the early influences of the so-called "California Sound" (which would include singers like Jackson Browne and Linda Ronstadt and bands such as Eagles). Yet Nelson himself did not reach the Top 40 again until 1970, when he recorded Bob Dylan's "She Belongs to Me" with the Stone Canyon Band, featuring Randy Meisner, who in 1971 became a founding member of the Eagles, and former Buckaroo steel guitarist Tom Brumley.

"Garden Party" and short-lived comeback

In 1972, Nelson reached the Top 40 one last time with "Garden Party," a song he wrote in disgust after a Richard Nader Oldies Concert at Madison Square Garden where the audience booed, perhaps against some unrelated police action. However, Nelson may have felt that the reason was because he was playing new songs instead of just his old hits.  When he performed The Rolling Stones' "Honky Tonk Women," there was booing, said to be against police and not him.  He was watching the rest of the performance on a TV monitor backstage until Richard Nader finally convinced Nelson to return to the stage and play his "oldies." He returned to the stage and played his "oldies" and the audience responded with applause, according to Deborah Nader, President of Richard Nader Entertainment. He wanted to record an album featuring original material, but the single was released before the album because Nelson had not completed the entire Garden Party album yet. "Garden Party" reached No. 6 on the Billboard Hot 100 and #1 on the Billboard Adult Contemporary chart and was certified as a gold single. The second single released from the album was "Palace Guard" which peaked at #65.

In 1973, MCA Records, whose parent company MCA Inc. had owned American Decca since 1962, ceased the label's operations, and transferred Nelson (and many other Decca artists) to its roster. His comeback was short-lived, and Nelson's band soon resigned. MCA wanted Nelson to have a producer on his next album. A new band was formed by Lindy Goetz, then a promotion person at MCA Records.  Nelson's band moved to Aspen and changed their name to "Canyon." Nelson and the new Stone Canyon Band began to tour for the Garden Party album. Nelson still played nightclubs and bars, but he soon advanced to higher-paying venues because of the success of Garden Party.In 1974, MCA was unsure as to what to do with the former teen idol. Albums like Windfall failed to have an impact. Nelson became an attraction at theme parks like Knott's Berry Farm and Disneyland. He also started appearing in minor roles on television shows.

Nelson tried to score another hit but did not have any luck with songs like "Rock and Roll Lady." With seven years to go on his contract, MCA dropped him from the label.

Personal life

In 1957, when Nelson was 17, he met and fell in love with Marianne Gaba, who played the role of Ricky's girlfriend in three episodes of Ozzie and Harriet. Nelson and Gaba were too young to enter a serious relationship, although according to Gaba "we used to neck for hours."

The next year, Nelson fell in love with 15-year-old Lorrie Collins, a country singer appearing on a weekly telecast called Town Hall Party. The two wrote Nelson's first composition, the song "My Gal", and she introduced him to Johnny Cash and Tex Ritter. Collins appeared in an Ozzie and Harriet episode as Ricky's girlfriend and sang "Just Because" with him in the musical finale. They went steady and discussed marriage, but their parents discouraged the idea. Harriet Nelson never approved of Ricky's teenage girlfriends or of his dating during those younger years. She had certain expectations for Ricky's personal life as well as his career.

Kris Harmon
At Christmas 1961, Nelson began dating Kristin Harmon (June 25, 1945 – April 26, 2018), a daughter of football player Tom Harmon and actress Elyse Knox (née Elsie Kornbrath) and the older sister of Kelly and Mark Harmon. The Nelsons and the Harmons had long been friends, and a union between their children held great appeal. Rick and Kris had much in common: quiet dispositions, Hollywood upbringings, and high-powered, domineering fathers.

They married on April 20, 1963. Kris was pregnant, and Rick later described the union as a "shotgun wedding". Nelson, a nonpracticing Protestant, received instruction in Catholicism at the insistence of the bride's parents and signed a pledge to have any children of the union raised in the Catholic faith. Kris Nelson joined the television show as a regular cast member in 1963. They had four children: actress Tracy Kristine Nelson, twin sons Gunnar Eric Nelson and Matthew Gray Nelson who formed the band Nelson, and Sam Hilliard Nelson.

By 1975, following the birth of their last child, the marriage had deteriorated and a very public, controversial divorce involving both families was covered in the press for several years. In October 1977, Kris filed for divorce and asked for alimony, custody of their four children, and a portion of community property. The couple temporarily resolved their differences, but Kris retained her attorney to pursue a permanent break. Kris wanted Rick to give up music, spend more time at home, and focus on acting, but the family enjoyed a recklessly expensive lifestyle, and Kris's extravagant spending left Rick no choice but to tour relentlessly. The impasse over Rick's career created unpleasantness at home. Kris became an alcoholic and left the children in the care of household help. After years of legal proceedings, they were divorced in December 1982. The divorce was financially devastating for Nelson, with attorneys and accountants taking over $1 million. Years of legal wrangling followed.

Helen Blair

In 1980, Nelson met Helen Blair, a part-time model and exotic-animal trainer, in Las Vegas. Within months of their meeting, she became his road companion, and in 1982 she began living in with him. She was the only woman he dated after his divorce.

Blair acted as personal assistant to Nelson, organizing his day and acting as a liaison for his fan club, but Nelson's mother, brother, business manager, and manager disapproved of her presence in his life. He contemplated marrying her but eventually declined. Blair died with Nelson in the airplane fire. Her name was never mentioned at Nelson's funeral. Blair's parents wanted their daughter buried next to Nelson at Forest Lawn Cemetery, but Harriet Nelson dismissed the idea. The Blairs refused to bury Helen's remains and filed a $2 million wrongful death suit against Nelson's estate. They received a small settlement. Nelson did not provide for Blair in his will.

Comeback tour
In 1985, Nelson began a "Comeback tour" with Fats Domino. He put the "y" back on his name and became "Ricky" again. He sang the songs for which he was famous and released a greatest hits album, Ricky Nelson: All My Best. His comeback was cut short when, while on the tour circuit, his plane crashed on New Year's Eve.

Death

On December 31, 1985, Nelson died when the Douglas DC-3 on which he was a passenger crashed into trees, poles, and electrical wires, when it attempted to make an emergency landing while in flight between Guntersville, Alabama and Dallas, where he was to perform a New Year's Eve concert. Nelson's DC-3 seemed constantly beset by mechanical problems. The fatal fire was caused by a defective heater in the tail of the plane. The heater caught fire and filled the cabin with toxic fumes. While both pilots survived, all seven passengers died.

Legacy
 In 1994, a Golden Palm Star on the Palm Springs, California, Walk of Stars was dedicated to him.
 In 2004, Rolling Stone ranked Nelson #91 on their list of the 100 Greatest Artists of All Time.
 In 2005, at the 20th anniversary of Nelson's death, PBS televised Ricky Nelson Sings, a documentary featuring interviews with his children, as well as James Burton and Kris Kristofferson.
 Hall of Fame baseball player Rickey Henderson was named Rickey Nelson Henley after Ricky Nelson.
Discography

 Ricky (1957)
 Ricky Nelson (1958)
 Ricky Sings Again (1959)
 Rick Is 21 (1961)
 Rick Sings Nelson (1970)
 Rudy the Fifth (1971)
 Garden Party (1972)
 Windfall (1974)
 All My Best'' (1985)

Filmography

Notes

References

External links

 Rick/Ricky Nelson's official website
 
 
 
 Rockabilly Hall 
 Ricky Nelson interviewed on The Pop Chronicles (recorded November 17, 1967)
Ozzie and Harriet Nelson Papers (includes papers related to Ricky and David) at the University of Wyoming- American Heritage Center

1940 births
1985 deaths
People from Teaneck, New Jersey
People from Tenafly, New Jersey
American people of Swedish descent
Accidental deaths in Texas
American male child actors
American male film actors
American country rock singers
American country singer-songwriters
American rockabilly guitarists
American rock guitarists
American pop guitarists
American country guitarists
American male pop singers
American male radio actors
American male television actors
Burials at Forest Lawn Memorial Park (Hollywood Hills)
Charly Records artists
Decca Records artists
Epic Records artists
Grammy Award winners
Imperial Records artists
Singer-songwriters from New Jersey
Victims of aviation accidents or incidents in the United States
Victims of aviation accidents or incidents in 1985
Country musicians from New Jersey
20th-century American male actors
20th-century American singers
Guitarists from New Jersey
20th-century American guitarists
Rock and roll musicians
20th-century American male singers
Musicians killed in aviation accidents or incidents
American male singer-songwriters